Rafael Batatinha dos Santos (born 9 February 1990 in Senhor do Bonfim, Bahia), known as Rafael Batatinha, is a Brazilian professional footballer who plays as a forward.

References

External links

1990 births
Living people
Brazilian footballers
Association football forwards
Esporte Clube Bahia players
FC Cascavel players
Primeira Liga players
Liga Portugal 2 players
Segunda Divisão players
Anadia F.C. players
C.D. Tondela players
S.C. Beira-Mar players
C.D. Santa Clara players
G.D. Chaves players
Gil Vicente F.C. players
GS Loures players
Brazilian expatriate footballers
Expatriate footballers in Portugal
Brazilian expatriate sportspeople in Portugal